Milan Kyselý (born 16 March 1955) is a Czech rower. He competed in the men's eight event at the 1980 Summer Olympics.

References

1955 births
Living people
Czech male rowers
Olympic rowers of Czechoslovakia
Rowers at the 1980 Summer Olympics
Rowers from Prague